The 1960 All-Southwest Conference football team consists of American football players chosen by various organizations for All-Southwest Conference teams for the 1960 NCAA University Division football season.  The selectors for the 1960 season included the Associated Press (AP) and the United Press (UP).  Players selected as first-team players by both the AP and UP are designated in bold.

All Southwest selections

Backs
 Ronnie Bull, Baylor (AP-1; UPI-1)
 Lance Alworth, Arkansas (AP-1; UPI-1)
 Jimmy Saxton, Texas (AP-1; UPI-1)
 Roland Jackson, Rice (AP-1)
 Ronnie Bull, Baylor (UPI-1)

Ends
 John Burrell, Rice (AP-1; UPI-1)
 Jim Collier, Arkansas (AP-1; UPI-1)

Tackles
 Bob Lilly, TCU (AP-1; UPI-1)
 Jerry Mays, SMU (AP-1; UPI-1)

Guards
 Monte Lee, Texas (AP-1; UPI-1)
 Wayne Harris, Arkansas (AP-1; UPI-1)

Centers
 E. J. Holub, Texas Tech (AP-1; UPI-1)

Key
AP = Associated Press

UPI = United Press International

Bold = Consensus first-team selection of both the AP and UP

See also
1960 College Football All-America Team

References

All-Southwest Conference
All-Southwest Conference football teams